Vaccinium virgatum (commonly known as rabbit-eye blueberry, smallflower blueberry or southern black blueberry ) is a species of blueberry native to the Southeastern United States, from North Carolina south to Florida and west to Texas.

Description
Vaccinium virgatum is a deciduous shrub growing to 3 to 6 feet tall and with up to a 3-foot spread. The leaves are spirally arranged, oblate to narrow elliptic, 3 inches long and start out red-bronze in the spring only to develop into a dark-green. The flowers are white, bell-shaped, 5 mm long. The fruit is a berry 5 mm diameter, dark blue to black, bloomed pale blue-gray by a thin wax coating.

Pollination
Vaccinium virgatum is self-infertile, and must have two or more varieties to pollenize each other. Honeybees are inefficient pollinators, and carpenter bees frequently cut the corollas to rob nectar without pollinating the flowers. V. virgatum does best when pollinated by buzz pollination by bees, such as the native southeastern blueberry bee, Habropoda laboriosa.

Uses

Culinary
Berries of Vaccinium virgatum are edible and are used as sauces and syrups, and for breads, muffins, pancakes, and pies, and may have pain killing properties (antinociceptive effects).

Ornamental
Vaccinium virgatum is grown as an ornamental plant, especially for its fall colors, typically bright orange or red.

Cultivation
Vaccinium virgatum grows best on acid soil and is subject to few pests and diseases. Because it is not self-fruitful, two compatible varieties should be planted next to each other to maintain fruiting. If maintained with mulching, it may endure temperatures as low as 10 degrees Fahrenheit. The plants mature to heights from 3 to 6 feet, with a width of up to 3 feet. The plant has few insect or disease problems, however birds and squirrels consume its fruit.

References

External links 
Rabbiteye blueberry culture from Alabama Extension
The hepatitis healing power of blueberry leaves

virgatum
Blueberries
Flora of the Southeastern United States
Flora of Texas
Fruits originating in North America
Plants described in 1789
Garden plants of North America